Nicolae Costin (7 April 1936  – 16 February 1995) was a Moldovan politician and one of the leaders of the national emancipation movement from Moldavian SSR. He was a professor, executive chairman of the Popular Front of Moldova, deputy in the first elected Parliament (1990-1994) of the Republic of Moldova, co-author of the Declaration of Independence of the Republic of Moldova (27 August 1991), president of the Municipal Council and Mayor of the municipality Chişinău (1990-1994).

Biography 
Nicolae Costin was born on 7 April 1936 in Pecişte, Rezina District. After completing the primary school in his native village, he attended the Pedagogical School in the town of Orhei (1952-1956) and later the Faculty of History of the Moldova State University (1960-1965). 

He began his professional activity as a teacher at the school in Pecişte commune (1958-1960). After graduating from the Faculty, he worked as a lecturer at the Political Science Department of the Alecu Russo Pedagogical Institute in Bălți (1965-1974). At the same time, he is also pursuing PhD courses in the field of Political Science at the "M.V. Lomonosov" University of Moscow (1970-1973). He then works as a professor at the Moldova State University (1974-1990).

Mayor of Chișinău
In 1990 he was elected President of the Chișinău City Council and deputy in the first democratic parliament (1990-1994) of the Republic of Moldova. During the period 1990-1994 he was mayor of Chișinău, during which he manifested himself as the leader of the Popular Front of Moldova. Nicolae Costin was the co-author the Declaration of Independence of the Republic of Moldova (27 August 1991). He supported the problems of the Romanian language and the return to the Latin script, participating in the elaboration of the law on the state language.

He is considered the first mayor of Chișinău municipality who promoted more reforms in the development of the capital. On his proposal, the streets of Chișinău have received national names (Traian, Ștefan cel Mare, Nicolae Milescu-Spataru, Mihai Eminescu, Ion Creangă, Metropolitan Bănulescu-Bodoni, București, Calea Ieşilor, etc.), causing the dissatisfaction of anti-Romanian political organizations, which have demanded, in every electoral campaign, to return to the old Soviet names of the streets of Chișinău.

Nicolae Costin contributed, together with the ministries of the Republic of Moldova, to the opening of the high schools, as follows: Romanian-English  "Mircea Eliade", Romanian-Italian "Dante Alighieri", Romanian-French "Gheorghe Asache" and Romanian-German "Mihail Kogălniceanu", libraries, including the "Onisifor Ghibu" Library, at the reopening of the churches, including the Cathedral in the center of Chișinău, at the restoration of the monument of Stephen the Great from Chișinău. The busts of the classics of the Romanian language were installed and uncovered on the Alley of Classics from the "Ștefan cel Mare" Central Park.

Honours 
A street in Iaşi and another in Chişinău were named after him.

Versions about his death 
His death was shrouded in mystery, with different versions. The most vehement of these would be the one who claims that Mayor Costin was killed by representatives of hostile anti-national / pro-Russian political forces. It is assumed that the mayor was poisoned with radioactive caesium, brought from Russia, which was infiltrated in the armchair of the service car. The main evidence supporting this hypothesis is the almost simultaneous death of Nicolae Costin's service driver, who came from the same disease - leukemia.

Mayor Nicolae Costin's disease was very rapid, caesium being a radioactive element with a long disintegration. In the absence of a judicial inquiry, the causes of the tragic death of Nicolae Costin cannot be elucidated.

See also 
 Moldovan Declaration of Independence

References

External links 
Banca Naţională a Moldovei - Nicolae Costin

 

1936 births
1995 deaths
People from Rezina District
Moldova State University alumni
Mayors of Chișinău
Moldovan MPs 1990–1994
Popular Front of Moldova MPs
Romanian people of Moldovan descent